This is a list of number-one country albums in Canada by year from the RPM Country Albums chart.

1970s

1980s

1990s

2000s